Elmer James Bennett (born February 13, 1970) is an American former professional basketball player. At a height of 6'0" (1.83 m), he played at the point guard position.

High school
Bennett played competitively for Bellaire High School, in Bellaire, Texas.

College career
Bennett played college basketball at the University of Notre Dame, with the Fighting Irish, from 1988 to 1992.

Professional career
Bennett was selected by the Atlanta Hawks, in the second round (38th overall) of the 1992 NBA draft. Bennett played in 21 career games in the NBA, in a span of three seasons. He averaged 2.3 points per game over his NBA career.

Bennet played with Rochester Renegade, the Grand Rapids Hoops, the Fargo-Moorhead Fever and the Oklahoma City Cavalry in the Continental Basketball Association. His first European club was in Italy, as he played with Victoria Libertas Pesaro in 1995. He also played with CRO Lyon Basket in 1996. 

Bennett played most of his professional career in Spain. He landed in TAU Cerámica in 1997 and stayed there until 2003. He then played with Real Madrid, DKV Joventut and Cajasol Sevilla. Among his accomplishments are featured the 2001–02 Spanish League title with TAU Cerámica, two Spanish King's Cups with TAU also in 1999 (named also MVP) and 2002, another league in 2004–05 with Real Madrid and the 2005–06 FIBA EuroCup with DKV Joventut.

External links
Elmer Bennett at acb.com 
Elmer Bennett at euroleague.net
Elmer Bennett at fibaeurope.com
Elmer Bennett at legabasket.it 

1970 births
Living people
American expatriate basketball people in France
American expatriate basketball people in Italy
American expatriate basketball people in Spain
American men's basketball players
Atlanta Hawks draft picks
Basketball players from Illinois
Real Betis Baloncesto players
Cleveland Cavaliers players
Denver Nuggets players
Fargo-Moorhead Fever players
Grand Rapids Hoops players
Houston Rockets players
Joventut Badalona players
Liga ACB players
Notre Dame Fighting Irish men's basketball players
Oklahoma City Cavalry players
Parade High School All-Americans (boys' basketball)
Philadelphia 76ers players
Point guards
Real Madrid Baloncesto players
Rochester Renegade players
Saski Baskonia players
Sportspeople from Evanston, Illinois